Sanjib Baruah is an Indian professor of Political Studies at Bard College in New York, and an author and commentator specializing in the politics of Northeast India. His books include India Against Itself: Assam and the Politics of Nationality, Durable Disorder: Understanding the Politics of Northeast India, and In the Name of the Nation: India and its Northeast.

Early life and career 
Baruah was born in 1951 in Shillong, which was then the capital of Assam. 

Baruah obtained his Bachelor of Arts from Cotton College, Guwahati, Assam.  He went on to complete his Master of Arts from the University of Delhi.  He has said the experience of New Delhi and its intellectual and political life had a profound impact on him. 

From 1985 to 1987 Sanjib Baruah worked as an Associate of Committee on Southern Asian Studies at the University of Chicago, the institution that awarded him his PhD.  He said at interview that his research into the Northeast India topic only really began some time after he had completed his PhD.

Baruah has been serving as a professor at Bard College in New York State, USA.  Since 1989 Sanjib Baruah was a research associate at South Asia Center at Syracuse University.

Baruah also holds a concurrent position as Global Fellow at the Peace Research Institute in Oslo, Norway.

Selected works

Books

Journals

Interviews and commentaries
Baruah has been sought for commentaries and interviews over a wide range of publications including: Time Magazine; The New York Times; Times of India; The Statesman (India); TRT World; The Indian Express; Scroll.in; The Wire (India); and Al Jazeera English.

Awards and honors
 2021 ICAS Book Prize, Most Accessible and Captivating Work for the Non-Specialist Reader Accolade, from the International Convention of Asia Scholars

Notes

References

Sources

External links 
 
 The anxiety of incompleteness: An extract from Sanjib Baruah's In the Name of the Nation: India and Its Northeast (The Hindu, February 15, 2020) 

Indian academics
Indian writers
1951 births
Bard College
Living people